The Timeline is a documentary series developed by NFL Films and airs on NFL Network that documents select events of the National Football League.

Episodes

Season One

Season Two

Season Three

References

NFL Films
NFL Network original programming
Documentary television series about sports
2015 American television series debuts
2010s American documentary television series